Norwegian Design Council was a Norwegian state-controlled foundation that encouraged good design of Norwegian products as a key to improved innovation and the products international reputation and sales.

Among the activities of the Norwegian Design Council were awarding the  Merket for God Design and Design Effekt awards. It also cooperated closely with Innovation Norway concerning new ventures. The council worked as a competence centre and was funded by the Norwegian Ministry of Trade and Industry, through consulting and through other projects. 

The Norwegian Design Council was founded in 1963 by the Norwegian Export Council and the Confederation of Norwegian Enterprise. In 2014, the Norwegian Design and Architecture Centre (Norsk design- og arkitektursenter) was established as a fusion of the Norwegian Design Council with the Norwegian Form (Norsk Form), a national institution working in the fields of design, architecture, and urban development. The combined entity is housed in two renovated industrial buildings by the Aker River on Hausmanns gate in Oslo.

See also
 Scandinavian design

References

External links
Norwegian Centre for Design and Architecture.  website

Government agencies of Norway
Foundations based in Norway
Design institutions
Norwegian design
1963 establishments in Norway
Arts organizations established in 1963